List of countries by GDP (gross domestic product) may refer to:
List of countries by GDP (nominal), a list using the current exchange rates for national currencies (most recent year)
List of countries by GDP (nominal) per capita (most recent year)
List of countries by past and projected GDP (nominal) (IMF data: 1980–2027)
List of countries by past and projected GDP (nominal) per capita (IMF data: 1980–2027)
List of countries by GDP (PPP), a list using the concept of purchasing power parity to derive GDP estimates (most recent year)
List of countries by GDP (PPP) per capita (most recent year)
List of countries by past and projected GDP (PPP) (IMF data: 1980–2027)
List of countries by past and projected GDP (PPP) per capita (IMF data: 1980–2027)
List of countries by real GDP growth rate

See also

List of IMF ranked countries by GDP, IMF ranked GDP (nominal), GDP (nominal) per capita, GDP (PPP), GDP (PPP) per capita, Population, and PPP (data not current)
List of regions by past GDP (PPP) per capita
List of regions by past GDP (PPP)
List of country subdivisions by GDP over 200 billion US dollars
List of countries by total wealth
List of sovereign states by wealth inequality
List of countries by income equality
List of countries by Human Development Index